Fernando Medeiros da Silva (born 10 February 1996), known as Fernando Medeiros, is a Brazilian footballer who plays as a defensive midfielder for Kategoria Superiore club Egnatia in Albania.

Club career

Santos
Born in Santos, São Paulo, Medeiros joined Santos' youth setup in 2006, aged ten. After progressing through the club's youth setup, he was promoted to the main squad on 29 September 2015 by manager Dorival Júnior.

Medeiros made his first team – and Série A – debut on 6 December 2015, coming on as a second-half substitute for fellow youth graduate Alison in a 5–1 home routing of Atlético Paranaense. He scored his first senior goal the following 11 May, netting the last in a 3–0 Copa do Brasil away win against Galvez.

On 19 January 2017, after again appearing rarely, Medeiros was loaned to Botafogo-SP until the end of the 2017 Campeonato Paulista. On 22 May, he moved to Série B side Vila Nova also in a temporary deal, until the end of the year.

Upon returning from loan, Medeiros only featured for Santos' B-team.

Bahia
On 24 January 2019, Medeiros signed for Bahia after his contract with Peixe expired. He left the club at the end of May 2019, where his contract expired.

Portimonense
On 24 September 2019, he signed a 4-year contract with the Portuguese Primeira Liga club Portimonense.

Egnatia
He signed for Albanian club Egnatia on 18 July 2022.

Personal life
Fernando Medeiros' twin brother, Flávio, is also a footballer and a midfielder. He too played for Santos as a youth.

Career statistics

Honours
Santos
Campeonato Paulista: 2016
Copa São Paulo de Futebol Júnior: 2014
Copa do Brasil Sub-20: 2013

Bahia
Campeonato Baiano: 2019

References

External links
Santos official profile 

1996 births
Living people
Sportspeople from Santos, São Paulo
Brazilian twins
Twin sportspeople
Brazilian footballers
Association football midfielders
Campeonato Brasileiro Série A players
Campeonato Brasileiro Série B players
Santos FC players
Botafogo Futebol Clube (SP) players
Vila Nova Futebol Clube players
Esporte Clube Bahia players
Primeira Liga players
Ituano FC players
Portimonense S.C. players
Brazil youth international footballers
Brazilian expatriate footballers
Brazilian expatriate sportspeople in Portugal
Expatriate footballers in Portugal